Khvostovo is a rural locality (a village) in Beketovskoye Rural Settlement, Vozhegodsky District, Vologda Oblast, Russia. The population was 8 as of 2002.

Geography 
The distance to Vozhega is 72 km, to Beketovskaya is 17 km. Nikitino, Popovka Kalikinskaya, Petrovo, Chichirino are the nearest rural localities.

References 

Rural localities in Vozhegodsky District